Merowe is a town in Northern State, Sudan, near Karima Town, about  north of Khartoum. It borders the Nile and is the site of the Merowe Dam project.

Transport 

The old Merowe Town Airport existed 3km to the west next to a built up area to the west.

Sports 

 Al Ahli Club Merowe

See also 

 Railway stations in Sudan

References 

Populated places in Northern (state)